George "Ginky" SanSouci (August 8, 1971 – March 8, 2011) was a professional pool player from New York City.  He grew up in Yorkville, New York, and started his career as a player in Chelsea Billiards. SanSouci lived in Astoria, New York.

Early days
George Edward SanSouci Jr. was the son of George Edward SanSouci Sr. and Jeanne Marie Cawley. He was raised in the Yorkville Section of New York (currently Upper East Side) He was given nickname "Ginky" by his mother Jeanne when he was born; it was the first word that he said.  If anyone would call him "George," he never responded, but when they said the word "Ginky", he would giggle, it just stuck. He attended Bayard Rustin High School for the Humanities. He dropped out in his junior year. SanSouci lost his father at age four and was raised by his mother (who died in 1995) and an older sister, Irene.

Professional career
In 1995, Billiards Digest named San Souci as Rookie Player of the Year.
SanSouci retired in 2002 after he injured his neck, but he could not stay away from pool, slowly making a comeback. He competed regularly in a regional tour of the New York region, the Predator Nine-ball Tour, with Tony Robles, the 2004 BCA Open Champion, as the tournament director. His high run in straight pool was 343 consecutive shots which occurred on July 19, 2009 at Slate Billiards in New York City. SanSouci was also a member of the International Pool Tour, when it was active.

Titles
 1991 Massachusetts State 
 1993 Stamford Open 
 1994 Rhode Island State 
 1994 Fifth Annual Ocean State 
 1995 Rhode Island State 
 1995 Sixth Annual Ocean State 
 1996 Maine State 
 1996 Seventh Annual Ocean State 
 1997 Delaware State 
 1998 Camel Pro Ten-Ball Championship
 1999 National Straight Pool Championship
 1999 BCA Nine-Ball Championship
 2000 Derby City Classic 9-Ball
 2005 Rhode Island State

Personal life
SanSouci suffered a number of injuries during his career that took a toll on his competitive play. He had retired in 2002 because of neck surgery and then in 2003 began playing again. He then broke his left wrist in a car accident in 2004 and re-fractured it in another more serious car accident, resulting in new fractures to his wrist as well as his girlfriend being severely burnt, in 2009. Since his first neck injury, SanSouci was battling addiction to pain killers and alcohol . He spoke openly about his prescription drug addiction as well as his alcohol addiction in an interview with go4pool.net. In the interview he claimed to be seven days sober.

Death
SanSouci died on March 8, 2011, at age 39.

References

External links
 George "Ginky" SanSouci at "Ask the Pros" at AZBilliards.com.
  Billiards Digest - George SanSouci dies at 39
  Official Website

American pool players
Sportspeople from New York City
1971 births
2011 deaths
People from Yorkville, Manhattan